Antonio della Valle (1850, Naples-1935) was an Italian zoologist who specialised in  Amphipoda and Ascidiacea.

He held positions in the University of Modena and was later professor of  Comparative Anatomy at the University of Naples and was a member of the research  team at Stazione Zoologica in Naples.

Works
Partial list
1877 Contribuzioni alla storia naturale delle ascidie composte del Golfo di Napoli con la descrizione di alcune specie e varietà nuove di altre poco note. Napoli :Tip. Communi
1881 Nuove contribuzioni alla storia naturale delle ascidie composte del Golfo di Napoli. Atti Accad. nag. Lincei Series 3, Memoir 10: 431–498
1893 Gammarini del golfo di Napoli : Monografia / di Antonio della Valle. Con un atlante di 61 tavole in litografia. Hrsg. von der Zoologischen station zu Neapel.Series: Fauna und Flora des Golfes von Neapel 20 Berlin :R. Friedländer & Sohn

References

1850 births
1935 deaths
Italian zoologists
Academic staff of the University of Modena and Reggio Emilia
Academic staff of the University of Naples Federico II
19th-century Neapolitan people